Pulloullo is a village in the Nicobar district of Andaman and Nicobar Islands, India. It is located on the Little Nicobar Island, and is administered as part of the Great Nicobar tehsil.

Demographics 

According to the 2011 census of India, Pulloullo has 16 households. The effective literacy rate (i.e. the literacy rate of population excluding children aged 6 and below) is 39.39%.

References 

Villages in Great Nicobar tehsil